Murgul District is a district of Artvin Province of Turkey. Its seat is the town Murgul. Its area is 301 km2, and its population is 6,522 (2021).

Composition
There is one municipality in Murgul District:
 Murgul

There are 11 villages in Murgul District:

 Akantaş
 Ardıçlı
 Başköy
 Çimenli
 Damar
 Erenköy
 Kabaca
 Korucular
 Küre
 Osmanlı
 Petek

References

Districts of Artvin Province